Behind Jury Doors is a 1932 American pre-Code mystery film directed by B. Reeves Eason and starring Helen Chandler, William Collier Jr. and Blanche Friderici.

Cast
 Helen Chandler as Elsa Lanfield 
 William Collier Jr. as Steve Mannon 
 Blanche Friderici as Mrs. Lanfield 
 Franklin Parker as Casey 
 John Davidson as George Fisher 
 Walter Miller as Arthur Corbett 
 Richard Cramer as Gus Mauger 
 Jessie Arnold as Ma Mauger 
 Louis Natheaux as Halliday 
 Patsy Cunningham as Mame 
 James Gordon as William Wegand 
 Arthur Loft as James Collins 
 Gordon De Main as Dr. Emil Lanfield

References

Bibliography
 Michael R. Pitts. Poverty Row Studios, 1929–1940: An Illustrated History of 55 Independent Film Companies, with a Filmography for Each. McFarland & Company, 2005.

External links
 

1932 films
1932 mystery films
1930s English-language films
American mystery films
Films directed by B. Reeves Eason
Mayfair Pictures films
1930s American films